Comet is a 1985 popular-science book by Carl Sagan and Ann Druyan.  The authors describe the scientific nature of comets, as well as their varying roles and perceptions throughout history.  The evolution of human understanding of comets is also detailed, and thinkers and astronomers such as Edmond Halley, Immanuel Kant, and William Huggins are discussed.

The publication of the first edition was months ahead of the 1986 appearance of Halley's Comet. A 1997 edition includes additional material.

References

1985 non-fiction books
American non-fiction books
English-language books
Popular physics books
Random House books
Works by Carl Sagan
Astronomy books
Comets